Marquette is the largest city in the Upper Peninsula of the U.S. state of Michigan. Marquette is the county seat of Marquette County. Located on the shores of Lake Superior, Marquette is a major port, known primarily for shipping iron ore from the Marquette Iron Range. The city is partially surrounded by Marquette Charter Township, but the two are administered autonomously.  

Marquette is named after Jacques Marquette, a French Jesuit missionary who had explored the Great Lakes region. Marquette had a population of 20,629 at the 2020 census, making it the largest city in Michigan north of the Tri-Cities. Marquette is also the third-largest American city on Lake Superior, behind Duluth, Minnesota, and Superior, Wisconsin. Marquette's urban area extends south toward the community of Harvey, and west toward Negaunee and Ishpeming, at the base of the Huron Mountains.   

Marquette is the home of Northern Michigan University (NMU), a four-year public university. NMU's athletic teams are nicknamed the Wildcats, and compete primarily in the NCAA Division II Great Lakes Intercollegiate Athletic Conference (GLIAC). The men's ice hockey team, which competes in the NCAA Division I Central Collegiate Hockey Association (CCHA), won the Division I national championship in 1991.

History 

The land around Marquette was known to French missionaries of the early 17th century and the trappers of the early 19th century. Development of the area did not begin until 1844, when William Burt and Jacob Houghton (the brother of geologist Douglass Houghton) discovered iron deposits near Teal Lake west of Marquette. In 1845, Jackson Mining Company, the first organized mining company in the region, was formed.

The village of Marquette began on September 14, 1849, with the formation of a second iron concern, the Marquette Iron Company. Three men participated in organizing the firm: Robert J. Graveraet, who had prospected the region for ore; Edward Clark, agent for Waterman A. Fisher of Worcester, Massachusetts, who financed the company, and Amos Rogers Harlow. The village was at first called New Worcester, with Harlow as the first postmaster. On August 21, 1850, the name was changed to honor Jacques Marquette, the French Jesuit missionary who had explored the region. A second post office, named Carp River, was opened on October 13, 1851, by Peter White, who had gone there with Graveraet at age 18. Harlow closed his post office in August 1852. The Marquette Iron Company failed, while its successor, the Cleveland Iron Mining Company, flourished and had the village platted in 1854. The plat was recorded by Peter White. White's office was renamed as Marquette in April 1856, and the village was incorporated in 1859. It was incorporated as a city in 1871.

During the 1850s, Marquette was linked by rail to numerous mines and became the leading shipping center of the Upper Peninsula. The first ore pocket dock, designed by an early town leader, John Burt, was built by the Cleveland Iron Mining Company in 1859. By 1862, the city had a population of over 1,600 and a soaring economy.

In the late 19th century, during the height of iron mining, Marquette became nationally known as a summer haven. Visitors brought in by Great Lakes passenger steamships filled the city's hotels and resorts.

South of the city, K. I. Sawyer Air Force Base was an important Air Force installation during the Cold War, host to B-52H bombers and KC-135 tankers of the Strategic Air Command, as well as a fighter interceptor squadron. The base closed in September 1995, and is now the county's Sawyer International Airport.

Marquette continues to be a shipping port for hematite ores and, today, enriched iron ore pellets, from nearby mines and pelletizing plants. About 7.9 million gross tons of pelletized iron ore passed through Marquette's Presque Isle Harbor in 2005.

The Roman Catholic Bishop Frederic Baraga is buried at St. Peter Cathedral, which is the center for the Diocese of Marquette.

Lakeview Arena, an ice hockey rink in Marquette, won the Kraft Hockeyville USA contest on April 30, 2016. The arena received $150,000 in upgrades, and hosted the Buffalo Sabres and Carolina Hurricanes on October 4, 2016, in a preseason NHL contest. Buffalo won the game 2–0.

Postal and philatelic history
In addition to the Marquette #1 Post Office there is the "Northern Michigan University Bookstore Contract Station #384".

The first day of issue of a postal card showing Bishop Frederic Baraga took place in Marquette on June 29, 1984, and that of the Wonders of America Lake Superior stamp on May 27, 2006.

Geography and climate

Geography

The city includes several small islands (principally Middle Island, Gull Island, Lover's Island, Presque Isle Pt. Rocks, White Rocks, Ripley Rock, and Picnic Rocks) in Lake Superior. The Marquette Underwater Preserve lies immediately offshore.

Marquette Mountain, used for skiing, is located in the city, as is most of the land of Marquette Branch Prison of the Michigan Department of Corrections. The town of Trowbridge Park (under Marquette Township), is located to the west, Sands Township to the south, and Marquette Township to the northwest of the city.

Climate
The climate is a hemiboreal humid continental (Köppen: Dfb) with four distinct seasons that are strongly moderated by Lake Superior and is located in Plant Hardiness zone 5b. Narrative below is based on chart below, reflecting 1991-2020 climate normals. Winter temperatures are slightly warmer than inland locations at a similar latitude due to the release of the heat stored by the lake, which moderates the climate. On average, there are 11.6 days annually where the minimum temperature reaches  and 73 days with a maximum at or below freezing, including a majority of days during meteorological winter (December thru February).

Being located in the snowbelt region, Marquette receives a significant amount of snowfall during the winter months, mostly from lake-effect snow. The snow depth in winter usually exceeds . Marquette is the city with the deepest snow depths with a population of more than 20,000 in the US (and one of the largest in North America outside the western Cordillera or eastern Canada), as temperatures remain low throughout the winter and cold, dry air is intercepted by the Great Lakes.

The warmest months, July and August, each average , showing somewhat of a seasonal lag. The surrounding lake cools summertime temperatures and as a result, temperatures above  are rare, with only 3.4 days per year. Spring and fall are transitional seasons that are generally mild though highly variable due to the alternation of air masses moving quickly. Spring is usually cooler than fall because the surrounding lake is slower to warm than the land, while in fall the lake releases heat, warming the area.

Marquette receives  of precipitation per year, which is fairly evenly distributed throughout the year, though September and October are the wettest months with February and March being the driest. The average window for morning freezes is October 15 thru May 7. Marquette receives an average of 2,294 hours of sunshine per year or 51 percent of possible sunshine, ranging from a low of 29 percent in December to a high of 68 percent in July.

The City of Marquette has received national attention for its measures to adapt to climate change, such as coastline restoration and moving portions of Lakeshore Boulevard which are flooded by Lake Superior 100 yards inland. Property owners are required to maintain “riparian buffers” of native plants along waterways. A county task force has created a guidebook in cooperation with the University of Michigan for landscaping which can reduce the habitat for disease-bearing ticks. A federally funded stormwater drain project will route runoff which flows into Lake Superior into restored wetlands. At the time of a 2014 NOAA climate study, climate change was expected to lead to rising temperatures, a longer growing season, and greater precipitation in Marquette.

Demographics

2020 census 
As of the 2020 census, there were 20,629 people, 8,163 households, and 3,651 families residing in the city. The racial makeup of the city was 90.5% White, 3.6% African American, 0.4% Native American, 0.4% Asian, 0.7% from other races, and 4.7% from two or more races. Hispanic or Latino of any race were 2.5% of the population.

There were 8,163 households, of which 16% had children under the age of 18 living with them, 32% were married couples living together, 8.2% had a female householder with no husband present, 4.5% had a male householder with no wife present, and 55.3% were non-families. 36.1% of all households were made up of individuals, and 12.5% had someone living alone who was 65 years of age or older. The average household size was 2.17 and the average family size was 2.7.

The median age of the city was 40.2 years. 11.2% of residents were under the age of 18; 30.2% were between 18 and 24; 22.8% were from 25 to 44; 19.9% were from 45 to 64; and 15.8% were 65 years of age or older. The gender makeup of the city was 50.7% male and 49.3% female.

2010 census
As of the census of 2010, there were 21,355 people, 8,321 households, and 3,788 families residing in the city. The racial makeup of the city was 91.1% White, 4.4% African American, 1.5% Native American, 0.9% Asian, 0.3% from other races, and 1.8% from two or more races. Hispanic or Latino of any race were 1.4% of the population.

There were 8,321 households, of which 18.6% had children under the age of 18 living with them, 33.3% were married couples living together, 9.0% had a female householder with no husband present, 3.3% had a male householder with no wife present, and 54.5% were non-families. 38.2% of all households were made up of individuals, and 11.8% had someone living alone who was 65 years of age or older. The average household size was 2.05 and the average family size was 2.71.

The median age in the city was 29.1 years. 12.2% of residents were under the age of 18; 30.6% were between the ages of 18 and 24; 22.3% were from 25 to 44; 21.9% were from 45 to 64; and 13% were 65 years of age or older. The gender makeup of the city was 51.8% male and 48.2% female.

2000 census
At the 2000 census, there were 19,661 people, 8,071 households and 4,067 families residing in the city. The racial makeup of the city was 95% White, 0.8% African American, 1.7% Native American, 0.8% Asian, 0% Pacific Islander, 0.22% from other races, and 1.33% from two or more races. Hispanic or Latino of any race were 0.77% of the population. 15.5% were of German, 12.6% Finnish, 8.9% French, 8.5% English, 8.2% Irish, 6.8% Italian and 6.7% Swedish ancestry according to Census 2000.

There were 8,071 households, of which 23.0% had children under the age of 18 living with them, 37.2% were married couples living together, 10.2% had a female householder with no husband present, and 49.6% were non-families. 37.0% of all households were made up of individuals, and 11.5% had someone living alone who was 65 years of age or older. The average household size was 2.13 and the average family size was 2.81.

Age distribution was 16.8% under the age of 18, 25.9% from 18 to 24, 23.8% from 25 to 44, 19.7% from 45 to 64, and 13.8% who were 65 years of age or older. The median age was 31 years. For every 100 females, there were 94.4 males. For every 100 females age 18 and over, there were 92.4 males.

The median household income was $29,918, and the median family income was $48,120. Males had a median income of $34,107 versus $24,549 for females. The per capita income for the city was $17,787. About 7.2% of families and 17.0% of the population were below the poverty line, including 12.3% of those under age 18 and 5.1% of those age 65 or over.

Business
Along with Northern Michigan University, the largest employers in Marquette are the Marquette Area Public Schools, UP Health System-Marquette (a regional medical center that is the only Level 2 Trauma center in the Upper Peninsula), Marquette Branch Prison, RTI Surgical, Charter Communications, and Blue Cross Blue Shield of Michigan.

Marquette is known for its breweries, including Ore Dock Brewing Company and Blackrocks Brewery. Five breweries were extant in the city.

Marquette's port was the 140th largest in the United States in 2015, ranked by tonnage.

Recreation and tourism

Recreational facilities

Presque Isle Park is located on the north side of the city. The largely untouched, forested landscape of the park was the result of a 1891 visit from landscape architect Frederick Law Olmsted, who refused to develop a plan for it due to his belief that it "should not be marred by the intrusion of artificial objects." Amenities include a wooden band shell for concerts, a park pavilion, a gazebo, a marina, a concession stand, picnic tables, barbecue pits, walking/skiing trails, playground facilities, and Moosewood Nature Center. The city has two beaches, South Beach Park and McCarty's Cove. McCarty's Cove is flanked by a red U.S. Coast Guard Station lighthouse on its south shore. Both beaches have picnic areas, grills, children's playgrounds and lifeguard stands. Other parks include Tourist Park, Founder's Landing, LaBonte Park, Mattson Lower Harbor Park, Park Cemetery, Shiras Park, Williams Park, Harlow Park, Pocket Park, Spring Street Park and Father Marquette Park.

There are also numerous other recreational facilities located within the city. Lakeview Arena is best known for its use as an ice hockey facility, but it also hosts a number of public events. A skateboard park is located just outside the arena and open during the summer. Lakeview Arena was home to the Marquette Electricians and Marquette Senior High School's Redmen hockey team. In 1974, the arena replaced the historic Palestra, which had been located a few blocks away. Gerard Haley Memorial Baseball field home of the Marquette Blues and Reds is located in the north side along with numerous little league and softball fields. Marquette is home to the largest wooden dome in the world, the Superior Dome—unofficially but affectionately known as the YooperDome. During the football season, the Dome is used primarily for football on its newly renovated AstroTurf field. The turf was installed in July 2009. Northern Michigan University holds its home football games in the Dome, as does the Michigan High School Athletic Association with the upper peninsula's High School football playoffs. The dome also hosts numerous private and public events that draw in thousands from around the region. The Marquette Golf Club has brought international recognition to the area for its unique and dramatic Greywalls course, opened in 2005.

The city is also known for fishing for deep water lake trout, whitefish, salmon and brown trout.

Marquette has an extensive network of biking and walking paths. The city has been gradually expanding the paths and has been promoting itself as a walkable and livable community. Cross Country ski trails are also located at Presque Isle Park and the Fit Strip.

Camping facilities are located at Tourist Park.

The combination of hilly terrain (a  vertical difference from top to bottom) and large area snow falls makes snowboarding and downhill skiing a reality on the edge of town.

Museums, galleries, and lighthouses
 The Marquette Maritime Museum, including the Marquette Harbor Light;
 The Upper Peninsula Children's Museum, Baraga Avenue.
 The Marquette County History Museum.
 The DeVos Art Museum, Northern Michigan University.
 The Oasis Gallery for Contemporary Art.

Festivals and events

 Art on the Rocks—art festival at Ellwood Mattson Lower Harbor Park
 Hiawatha Music Festival Traditional music festival at Tourist Park
 Marquette's July 4 Celebration
 Marquette's Blueberry Festival 
 Superior Bike Fest
 UP 200 Dog Sled Race
 Noquemanon Ski Marathon
 Marquette Area Blues Fest
 Marquette Scandinavian Midsummer Festival and Wife-Carrying Contest
 U.P. Fall Beer Festival-hosted by Michigan Brewers Guild 
 Ore to Shore
 Marquette Marathon
 OutBack Art Fair

Live theatrical productions are also provided through Northern Michigan University's Forest Roberts Theatre and Black Box Theatre, Marquette's Graveraet School Kaufman Auditorium and Lake Superior Theatre, a semi-professional summer stock theatre.

Transportation

Marquette is served by American Eagle and Delta Connection out of Sawyer International Airport (MQT, KSAW) with daily flights to Chicago and Detroit.

The city is served by a public transit system known as MarqTran, which runs buses through the city and to nearby places such as Sawyer International Airport and Ishpeming. The system operates out of a transit center in the adjacent Marquette Township in addition to a small transfer station in downtown. In addition, Indian Trails bus lines operates daily intercity bus service between Hancock and Milwaukee, Wisconsin. The line operates a stop at MarqTran's transit center.

Marquette has limited freight rail service by the Lake Superior and Ishpeming Railroad (LS&I). The Canadian National Railway also goes through nearby Negaunee. The LS&I serves the Upper Harbor Ore Dock, which loads iron ore pellets from nearby mining operations onto lake freighters for shipment throughout the Great Lakes.

Three of MDOT's state highways serve Marquette as did a former business route for US 41 and a former state highway.
  are two highways continuing westerly and northerly toward Houghton and Wakefield and southerly toward Escanaba and Sault Ste. Marie.
  previously ran through downtown Marquette before the streets carrying it were turned back to city control in 2005.
  is a highway providing a connection to Sawyer International Airport and Gwinn.
  previously ran along a section of Division Street on the south side of the city before it was turned over to city control in 2005

Education

Public schools
The City of Marquette is served by the Marquette Area Public Schools. The district is the largest school district in the Upper Peninsula and Northern Wisconsin, with about 3,100 students and 420 faculty and Staff.
 Marquette Senior High School, grades 9-12 (Marquette Area Public Schools)
 Marquette Alternative High School at Vandenboom (Marquette Area Public Schools)
 Bothwell Middle School, grades 6-8 (Marquette Area Public Schools)
 Cherry Creek Elementary (Marquette Area Public Schools)
 Graveraet Elementary (Marquette Area Public Schools)
 Sandy Knoll Elementary School (Marquette Area Public Schools)
 Superior Hills Elementary School (Marquette Area Public Schools)
 North Star Academy (public charter Montessori K-12)

Private schools
 Father Marquette Elementary School
 Father Marquette Middle School

Universities
 Marquette is home to Northern Michigan University, the Upper Peninsula's largest university at just under 10,000 students.

Public libraries
 Peter White Public Library

Media
Multiple media outlets provide local coverage of the Marquette area.
 Newspaper: The Mining Journal, The North Wind, and Marquette Monthly
 Television: WLUC-TV/WLUC-DT2, WBUP-TV/WBKP, WZMQ, WNMU-TV and WJMN-TV
 Radio: WNMU-FM, WHWL-FM, WUPK-FM, WFXD-FM, WUPT-FM, WUPX, WJPD-FM, WUPZ-FM, WKPK-FM, WUPG-FM, WGLQ-FM, WRUP-FM, WNGE-FM, WKQS-FM, WCMM-FM, W291BH, WMQT, WDMJ-AM, WZAM-AM

Notable people

 Stephen Adamini, politician
 Mike Bordick, baseball player
 Edward Breitung, minister
 Leonard Brumm, college hockey coach
 Alfred Burt, composer of Christmas carols
 Kyle Carr, speed skater
 Curtis L. Carter, academic and founder of the Patrick and Beatrice Haggerty Museum of Art
 Tony Chebatoris, the only person executed in Michigan since 1846
 Sallie W. Chisholm, oceanographer
 Robert William Davis, politician
 Shani Davis, speed skater
 Susan Diol, actress
 Dallas Drake, NHL player
 Nita Engle, artist
 Robert Erickson, composer
 Joe Fine, mayor of Marquette 1964–1965 and prominent businessman
 Justin Florek, NHL player
 Vernon Forrest, boxer
 James Henry Garland, Catholic bishop
 John Gilmore, NFL tight end
 Patricia Hogan, professor
 John Henry Jacobs, former mayor
 Louis Graveraet Kaufman, banker
 Alfred V. Kidder, archaeologist
 Reynolds R. Kinkade, justice of the Ohio Supreme Court
 John Kivela, former mayor
 John Munro Longyear, former mayor and land developer
 Mary Beecher Longyear, philanthropist
 John Lautner, architect
 Francis Joseph Magner, Catholic bishop
 John D. Mangum, politician
 Aghasi Manukyan, wrestler
 Helen Maroulis, wrestler
 Beverly Matherne, writer
 C. V. Money, coach
 Jon Morosi, sportswriter and reporter
 Ignatius Mrak, bishop of the Roman Catholic Diocese of Marquette
 William J. Olcott, mining executive and college football player
 Weldon Olson, hockey player
 David Palumbo, illustrator
 Jimmy Peters, Sr., NHL hockey player
 Hjalmar Peterson, musician and comedian
 Joseph G. Pinten, Catholic bishop
 Jeremy Porter, rock musician
 Robert Roosa, economist
 Chris Rothfuss, Wyoming politician
 Ralph Royce, USAF general
 Mark Francis Schmitt, Catholic bishop
 Bernard F. Sliger, former president, Florida State University
 Sycamore Smith, folk musician
 Matthew Songer, surgeon
 Frederic Dorr Steele, illustrator
 Mary Stein, actress
 Wendel Suckow, luger
 Jane Summersett, ice dancer
 Alfred P. Swineford, former mayor and newspaper editor
 John Vertin, Catholic bishop
 Peter White, businessman

In popular culture

 John D. Voelker (who wrote as Robert Traver) set his novels Anatomy of a Murder (1958) and Laughing Whitefish (1965) in Marquette. The film version of Anatomy of a Murder, dramatizing a 1952 murder that happened in the area and the subsequent trial, was partly filmed in Marquette and Big Bay. Much of it was filmed in the Marquette County Courthouse in Marquette, where the actual murder case had been tried. Traver's Danny and the Boys (1951) is a collection of short stories set in and around Marquette.
 Philip Caputo set his novel Indian Country (1987) in the Upper Peninsula and several scenes depict Marquette.
 Jim Harrison's novel True North (2005) tells about a Marquette family whose wealth is based on exploiting Upper Peninsula timber.
 Jeffrey Eugenides' Pulitzer Prize winning novel, Middlesex (2002) refers to Marquette by name, in addition to other locations in Michigan.
 A large portion of the graphic novel Blankets, by Craig Thompson, takes place in Marquette.
 The Adult Swim television series Joe Pera Talks with You was partially filmed at and takes place in and around the city.

Sister cities
Marquette has two sister cities.
  Higashiōmi (Japan) since 1979
  Kajaani (Finland) 1997

See also
 Arch and Ridge Streets Historic District
 Big Bay Point Light
 List of shipwrecks of the 1913 Great Lakes storm

References

External links

 City of Marquette

 
Cities in Marquette County, Michigan
County seats in Michigan
Michigan populated places on Lake Superior
Micropolitan areas of Michigan
Populated places established in 1849
1849 establishments in Michigan